Hartley High School or Hartley School is a public high school located in Hartley, Texas (USA) and is classified as a 1A school by the UIL. It is part of the Hartley Independent School District located in northeastern Hartley County. In 2015, the school was rated "Met Standard" by the Texas Education Agency.

Athletics
The Hartley Tigers compete in these sports - 

Basketball
Cross Country
Golf
Tennis
Track and Field

State Titles
Girls Cross Country 
2014(1A),

References

External links
Hartley ISD

Public high schools in Texas
Schools in Hartley County, Texas